Velký Beranov is a municipality and village in Jihlava District in the Vysočina Region of the Czech Republic. It has about 1,300 inhabitants.

Administrative parts
Villages of Bradlo and Jeclov are administrative parts of Velký Beranov.

References

Villages in Jihlava District